Wenceslao Paunero may refer to
Wenceslao Paunero (general) (1805–1871), Argentine general
Wenceslao Paunero (fencer) (1887–1937), Argentine fencer